Boi Akih is a jazz/world music trio based in Amsterdam, Netherlands and composed of Monica Akihary on vocals, Niels Brouwer on guitar. The group combines musical traditions from the Molucca Islands, Bali, Dutch jazz, improvised music, Indian classical music, and traditional African music. Music is written by Brouwer and lyrics are written by Brouwer and Akihary.

History
Sandip Bhattachraya studied with Pandit Ishwar Lal Misra in the style of tabla musician Pandit Anokhelal Misra and has performed with Pandit Hariprasad Chaurasia, Prabha Atre, Lakshmi Shankar, Shujaat Hussain Khan, Ustad Munawar Ali Khan, and Tarun Bhattacharya. Niels Brouwer studied at the Hilversums Conservatorium (Conservatorium van Amsterdam) Monica Akihary is a graduate of visual arts studies in Amsterdam and Yogyakarta (Akademi Seni Rupa). Both studied classical Indian music in Bangalore (2002) and Mumbai (2004).

Akihary writes and sings in her father's native language, which has been regarded as moribund. Since 1998 Brouwer and Akihary have been working with Dutch and Australian linguists who study Haruku language. 

They invited gamelan musician Made Subandi to perform on Philosophy of Love (2010). Boi Akih has worked with Michael Vatcher, Ernst Reijseger, Ernst Glerum, Owen Hart Jr.,  Sean Bergin, and Wolter Wierbos.  Boi Akih has performed at the Berlin Jazz Festival, Kaunas Jazz Festival, and Bimhuis. They have also appeared on VPRO, France2, Radio France, BBC, ORF, and RTL4.

Discography
 1997 Boi Akih (Invitation/EMI, 1997)
 2000 Above the Clouds, Among the Roots  (A Records, 2000)
 2003 Uwa i (Enja, 2004)
 2005 Lagu Lagu (Boiakih, 2005)
 2007 Yalelol (Enja, 2007)
 2012 Circles in a Square Society
 2020 Storyteller (BROMO Sena)

External links
 Boi Akih in Vrije Geluiden Sessies live 2020

References

Chamber jazz ensembles
Folk jazz musicians
World music groups
Enja Records artists